Paul Meloy is an English born writer of what Graham Joyce referred to as "Fractured Realism".

Biography 

Meloy was born in 1966 in Surrey, UK. He went to school in Sutton and worked in a variety of mental health settings, institutions and environments with people who have mental health issues or learning disabilities. His writing demonstrates that his work as a mental health professional has influenced his work. 
He is now married and currently lives in Torquay in Devon, England.

Meloy has a long history with TTA Press, debuting in The Third Alternative #14 with The Last Great Paladin of Idle Conceit. The magazine Black Static, the successor to The Third Alternative, borrowed its name from another Meloy story and in 2008, TTA Press published a critically acclaimed collection of his work, Islington Crocodiles.

Islington Crocodiles is a chronological collection of Meloy's short stories.

Books 

 Islington Crocodiles (2008) - 'Montag Press 
 Dogs With Their Eyes Shut, novella, PS Publishing, 2013
 The Night Clock, novel, Solaris, 2015.
 Adornments of the Storm, novel, sequel to The Night Clock, Solaris, 2019
 Electric Breakfast, collection, Montag Press, 2022

 Published stories 

 The Last Great Paladin of Idle Conceit - The Third Alternative #14
 Raiders - The Third Alternative #27
 Care in the Continuum - The Third Alternative #30
 Don't touch the Blackouts - The Third Alternative #34
 Running Away to Join the Town - Nemonymous #5
 Black Static - The Third Alternative #40
 Dying in the arms of Jean Harlow - The Third Alternative #42
 Islington Crocodiles - Interzone #208
 The Vague - Published in British Invasion, an anthology edited by Tim Lebbon
 Visibility down to Zero - published in Killers, an anthology edited by Colin Harvey
 All Mouth - Black Static #6
 Alex and the Toyceivers - Published in Paper Cities: An Anthology of Urban Fantasy, an anthology edited by Ekaterina Sedia
 Electric Breakfast - PS Publishing
 Bullroarer  (re-titled "Remember Prosymnus" in Electric Breakfast) (End Of The Line. Anthology ed. by Jonathan Oliver 2010)
 Villanova (House Of Fear. Solaris anthology ed. by Jonathan Oliver 2011) 
 The Compartments Of Hell (with Sarah Pinborough Black Static # 2011) 
 Carrion Cowboy (Gutshot antho ed. by Conrad Williams 2011)
 Dogs With Their Eyes Shut (novella PS Publishing 2012) 
 Night Closures (Novella. Visions Fading Fast edited by Gary McMahon 2012)
 Loose (with Gary Greenwood 2012)
 Driver Error. end of the Road, anthology 2012, Solaris.
 Reclamation Yard. black Static 40, 2014.
 Junction Creature, novella, Islington Crocodiles.
 The Serile, Adam's Ladder, anthology edited by Darren Speegle.
 The Gearbox, Prisms (anthology edited by Darren Speegle).
 Reculver, novella, Creatures anthology edited by David Moore.
 The Loved One, Great British Horror 3, For Those in Peril
 Dirty Black Summer, short story, Electric Breakfast.
 Imprecations from the Vacant Lot, (Forthcoming)
 Their Glory Is Like the Flowers of the Field (Forthcoming)

Essays

When Worlds Collide, Cinema Futura, ed. Mark Morris.

 Awards 

 2005 British Fantasy Awards – Best Short Story, "Black Static".

 Praise for Islington Crocodiles 

 "Paul Meloy is unique. No other writer plumbs the dream pool to such depths and sculpts addictive fiction from the awful things he finds there. He is the comedian that Hieronymous Bosch never was, the philosopher that Tommy Cooper failed to be. Make no mistake: Meloy is one of the most relevant writers in the world today. And these stories are pure gold. Treasure them." Charlie Williams
 "Meloy's voice is startlingly original, his stories both shocking and beautiful, and this book is destined to become a classic." Tim Lebbon
 "In the stories of Paul Meloy – where walk the living dead, genetically modified pandas, and the mad and terrible Nurse Melt, among others – raw, tell-it-like-it-is comedy brawls with trippy horror in a cage match for the human soul. Take a front row seat. Try not to get any blood on you." Joe Hill (writer)
 "Crisp and inventive, fresh and distinctive. Really, an unmissable gig!" Graham Joyce
 "The first thing is, you are in for a treat. The second is, keep your wits about you as you read this extraordinary work." David Mathew
 "I'm at a loss to describe Paul's work and do it justice because he really does have a unique voice and although at times both humorous and shocking, his stories always leave something with you." Sarah Pinborough
 "The book's language continues to jitterbug. You can put it in a cloth and feel it wriggle.". ''

References

External links

English fantasy writers
English horror writers
1966 births
People from Surrey
Living people
English male short story writers
English short story writers
English male novelists